Blapsilon montrouzieri is a species of beetle in the family Cerambycidae. It was described by James Thomson in 1865. It is known from New Caledonia.

References

Tmesisternini
Beetles described in 1865